Oscar Recer (born 1 January 1934) is a Romanian equestrian. He competed in two events at the 1960 Summer Olympics.

References

External links
 

1934 births
Living people
Romanian male equestrians
Olympic equestrians of Romania
Equestrians at the 1960 Summer Olympics
Sportspeople from Sibiu